Frederick Kill Harford (1832 - 11 November 1906) was an English clergyman, musician, poet, hymn writer and pioneer of music therapy. He founded the Guild of St Cecilia in 1891.

Harford was the third son of Henry Charles Harford and grew up in Clifton near Bristol. He studied at Rugby School and graduated from Christ Church, Oxford in 1850. He received a Bachelor of Arts from New Inn Hall in 1855 and a Master of Arts in 1858. He was ordained as a deacon by the Archbishop of Canterbury and later served as a priest and Chaplain to the Bishop of Gibraltar (1858-1861). He also served as Minor Canon, Westminster Abbey. He was an associate of the Royal Academy of Music and was a friend of Gustave Doré. Harford experimented on music and its healing properties particularly on the mentally ill and wrote about its possible role in reducing pain from physical ailments such as gout. His work on music as therapy received acclaim from Florence  Nightingale and Sir Richard  Quain.

References

Music therapists